Kewaskum High School is located in Kewaskum, Wisconsin, United States and is the lone high school in the Kewaskum School District. Kewaskum High School's instruction includes grades 9-12. As of the 2021-2022 school year, the student population is 579. The high school offers 12 Advance Placement courses as well as numerous courses that offer technical college credits.

Extracurricular activities and athletics 
Kewaskum HS offers a wide variety of activities, clubs, and sports. Kewaskum High School is also a member of the WIAA for sports such as football, boys' and girls' basketball, girls' volleyball, boys' and girls' golf, cross country, summer baseball, wrestling, track and field, boys' and girls' soccer, softball boys' and girls' bowling, girls' hockey, and boys' and girls' tennis. Other clubs and activities include but are not limited to chess club, Key club, Spanish club, cribbage club, mock trial, National Honor Society, band, choir, show choir, drama, theater, musical, and more. Kewaskum is a member of the East Central Conference and is predominately known for football. Since the new conference began in 2015, Kewaskum has been back to back conference champions in 2015 and tri-conference champions in 2016 along with the Berlin High School and Plymouth High School. Kewaskum football was previously dominant in the old conference, the Eastern Wisconsin Conference. From 2005 to 2017 the Indians made the WIAA Division III playoffs 13 consecutive seasons, including once going to the Level 4 playoff game against Waupaca High School in 2008.

KHS won a state championship in boys' cross country in 1961.

Conference history and rivalries 
Being in the newly made East Central Conference created in 2015, Kewaskum High School has since held multiple conference records within the East Central Conference.

Rivalries against Campbellsport High School and Plymouth High School has persisted since the old Eastern Wisconsin Conference. Every year, the Campbellsport Cougars and Kewaskum Indians battle for the "Kettle Moraine Bowl" during the football season. The winner of the game is presented with the trophy and is currently with Kewaskum from the 2016 season.

References 

Schools in Washington County, Wisconsin
Public high schools in Wisconsin